Marcinho is the nickname of several Brazilian footballers.

Marcinho (footballer, born 20 March 1981), Márcio Miranda Freitas Rocha da Silva, Brazilian football forward
Marcinho (footballer, born 25 March 1981), Márcio Ivanildo da Silva, Brazilian football midfielder
Marcinho (footballer, born July 1981), Márcio Luiz Adurens, Brazilian football attacking midfielder
Marcinho (footballer, born 1984), Márcio José de Oliveira, Brazilian football midfielder
Marcinho (footballer, born 1986), Marcio de Souza Gregório Júnior, Brazilian football midfielder
Marcinho Pitbull (born 1987), Márcio José Lisboa Fortes Filho, Brazilian football midfielder
Marcinho (footballer, born 1996), Márcio Almeida de Oliveira, Brazilian football defender
Marcinho (footballer, born May 1995), Márcio Augusto da Silva Barbosa, Brazilian football forward
Marcinho (footballer, born June 1995), Márcio Antônio de Sousa Júnior, Brazilian football winger
Marcinho (footballer, born July 1995), Márcio Barbosa Vieira Junior, Brazilian football midfielder
Marcinho (footballer, born 1998), Marcio Camillato Martinelli, Brazilian football midfielder